Alliance Gastronomique Néerlandaise (popular: Alliance Gastronomique) is a culinary association of quality restaurants in the Netherlands and Flanders.

The partnership was established in 1967 as a response to the spreading taste flattening, lack of culinary products and inadequate training of chefs and other restaurant staff. By that time the Netherlands were not known for their culinary tradition, so the partnership of the 19 founding restaurateurs was a break with the past.

At that time the "Alliance Gastronomique" stated the promotion of the culinary culture in the Netherlands as its mission.

Alliance Gastronomique is by now the oldest culinary partnership in Europe. The status it has earned, makes that the name alone now serves as quality seal.

Founding members
Members of Alliance Gastronomique Néerlandaise in 1967
 De Witte, Amersfoort. Head chef: Ernst Hastrich
 De Boerderij, Amsterdam. Head chef: Herman Wunneberg
 Dikker & Thijs, Amsterdam.  Head chef: H.J. van der Vecht
 De Echoput, Apeldoorn. Head chef: Jaap Klosse
 Chalet Royal, 's-Hertogenbosch. Head chef: C.A.M. van Gaalen
 Carelshaven, Delden. Head chef: J.E. Kluvers
 De Zwaan, Etten-Leur. Head chef: Ad Peijnenburg
 Oudt Leyden, Leiden. Head chef: S.M. Borgerding
 Château Neercanne, Maastricht. Head chef: H.P.J. Stassen
 De Beukenhof, Oegstgeest. Head chef: not known
 Het Oude Jachthuis, Pesse. Head chef: A.H. van Doesburg
 't Koetshuis, Rhenen. Head chef: Marianne Frisch
 Old Dutch, Rotterdam. Representative: M.W. Mannes
 De Witte Holevoet, Scherpenzeel. Head chef: J.C.M. Hehenkamp
 Prinses Juliana, Valkenburg aan de Geul. Head chef: A. Stevens
 De Nederlanden, Vreeland. Head chef: O.E.K. Hartung
 De Kieviet, Wassenaar. Head chef: Luigi Gandini
 Hostellerie De Hamert, Wellerlooi. Head chef: Jan. H.J. Grothausen
 Het Poorthuys, Zierikzee. Head chef: W.E.L. te Mey

Cas Spijkers, head chef De Swaen, often mentioned as one of the founders, is not mentioned in contemporary sources as founder.

Present member restaurants
(all restaurants in the Netherlands, unless stated otherwise)
 Bord’Eau (Hotel de L’Europe) - Amsterdam
Ciel Bleu (Hotel Okura Amsterdam) - Amsterdam (2 Michelin stars)
 Cordial - Oss (1 Michelin star)
 Da Vinci - Maasbracht (2 Michelin stars)
 De Bokkedoorns - Overveen (2 Michelin stars)
 De Fuik - Aalst (former star restaurant)
 De Gieser Wildeman - Noordeloos (1 Michelin star)
 De Heeren van Harinxma (Bilderberg Landgoed Lauswolt) - Beetsterzwaag (‘’former star restaurant’’)
 De Leuf - Ubachsberg (2 Michelin stars)
 De Librije - Zwolle (3 Michelin stars)
 De Pastorie - Lichtaart-Kasterlee, Belgium (1 Michelin star)
 De Treeswijkhoeve - Waalre (2 Michelin stars)
 De Zwaan - Etten-Leur (1 Michelin star)
 Hermitage - Rijsoord (1 Michelin star)
 Het Koetshuis - Bennekom (1 Michelin star)
 Hotel Gastronomique De Echoput - Apeldoorn (1 Michelin star)
 Hostellerie De Hamert - Wellerlooi (‘’former star restaurant’’)
 Kaatje bij de Sluis - Blokzijl (2 Michelin stars)
 La Rive (InterContinental Amstel Amsterdam) - Amsterdam (2 Michelin stars)
 Merlet - Schoorl (1 Michelin star)
 Oud Sluis - Sluis (3 Michelin stars)
 De Vlindertuin - Zuidlaren (1 Michelin star)
 Restaurant Dorset - Borne
 Restaurant Fred - Rotterdam (1 Michelin star)
 't Nonnetje - Harderwijk (1 Michelin star)
 Niven - Rijswijk (1 Michelin star)
 Restaurant Patrick Devos - Bruges - Belgium
 Restaurant Vinkeles - Amsterdam (1 Michelin star)
 Sonoy - Emmeloord (1 Michelin star)
 Tout à Fait - Maastricht (1 Michelin star)
 Wollerich - Sint Oedenrode (1 Michelin star)
 Yamazato (Hotel Okura Amsterdam) - Amsterdam (1 Michelin star)

Former member restaurants
(Incomplete list, feel free to add)
Chapeau! - Bloemendaal, closed (1 Michelin star)
 De Hoefslag, Bosch en Duin - 1 Michelin star
 De Karpendonkse Hoeve, Eindhoven - 1 Michelin star
 Kasteel Wittem, Wittem, closed - 1 Michelin star
 La Vilette, Rotterdam, closed - 1 Michelin star
 Nolet Het Reymerswale, Yerseke, closed - 1 Michelin star
 Restaurant Den Gouden Harynck, Bruges
 Ron Blaauw, Amsterdam - 2 Michelin stars
 ’t Raethuys, Wateringen, closed - 1 Michelin star
 De Bokkepruik, Heemse - 1 Michelin star
 De Wanne, Ootmarsum - 1 Michelin star
 Chalet Royal - 's-Hertogenbosch (1 Michelin star)
 Lai Sin's - Driebergen (‘’former star restaurant’’)
Herberg Onder de Linden in Aduard. (1 Michelin star)

External links
 Official website

References

Restaurants in the Netherlands
Gastronomical societies
Dutch cuisine